FC Slavia may refer to:

FC Slavia Mozyr: Belarusian football club 
SK Slavia Prague, Czech football club
PFC Slavia Sofia, Bulgarian football club